The 2013 Suzuki Swift Sport Cup season will be the sixth Suzuki Swift Sport Cup season. The season began at Hampton Downs on 16–17 February and finished at Pukekohe on 7–8 December 2013 after seven rounds.

In 2013, the series will shift from the supporting act for the New Zealand V8s to become the supporting class for the V8SuperTourer Championship

Championship calendar

Teams and drivers
Last years champion AJ Lauder will not be returning to the championship after graduating to the New Zealand V8s season.

The following teams and drivers will compete during the 2013 Suzuki Swift Sport Cup season.

Championship standings

References

External links
 

Suzuki
Suzuki Swift Sport Cup